Striped anemone may refer to:

Anthothoe chilensis Lesson, 1830, in the family Sagartiidae
Dofleinia armata, Wassilieff, 1908, also known as the armed anemone, in the family Actiniidae

Animal common name disambiguation pages